Jonas Holøs (born August 27, 1987) is a Norwegian professional ice hockey defenseman who is currently playing with Kölner Haie of the Deutsche Eishockey Liga (DEL). He participated in the 2010 and 2014 Winter Olympics as a member of Team Norway.

Playing career
Holøs began playing for hometown Norwegian team Sparta Warriors of the GET-ligaen in 2002, but after the  2007–08 season he signed with Färjestads BK of the Swedish Elitserien.

After the 2008 IIHF World Championship in Canada, he was invited to a summer camp with the Chicago Blackhawks. But on 21 June 2008, he was drafted by the Colorado Avalanche of the National Hockey League in the sixth round as the 170th overall pick. Returning to Sweden Holøs played in 55 games and recorded 8 goals for 16 points. Färjestad's General Manager, Thomas Rundqvist, stated before the 2009 Playoff finals that Holøs was the player who had evolved the most in the 2008–09 season, and that the Avalanche wanted him already in the autumn of 2009. But Holøs stated that he had a two-year contract with Färjestad, which he intended to fulfill. After finishing the 2009–10 season with 14 points for Färjestads he left the Elitserien and signed with the Colorado Avalanche to a two-year entry-level contract on May 26, 2010.

In the 2010–11 season, he made the Avalanche opening night roster out training camp. Holøs made his NHL-debut on October 16, 2010, against the New York Islanders leading all players in time on ice with 23:57 in his first game. He became the sixth Norwegian, following Bjørn Skaare, Anders Myrvold, Espen Knutsen, Ole-Kristian Tollefsen and Patrick Thoresen to play in the NHL. In his fourth game he set a new individual NHL-game record amongst Norwegians by logging a total of 27 minutes and 22 seconds of time on ice. On November 21, 2010, he was sent down to the Colorado's AHL affiliate, the Lake Erie Monsters. On December 19 he was back with the Avalanche, registering his third assist of the season, tying the Norwegian record of most assists in one season by a defenceman.

After failing to take a spot in the Avalanche's team for the 2011–12 season, Holøs asked for his release from the Avalanche organization on October 14, 2011, to move back to Europe. Two days later he was reassigned by the Colorado Avalanche to a two-year deal (expiring after the 2012–13 season) with the newcomers Växjö Lakers Hockey of the Swedish top-tier league Elitserien (SEL).

Upon completion of the 2012–13 season, his second with the Lakers and producing 17 points in 55 games, Holøs left as a free agent to sign a contract with Lokomotiv Yaroslavl of the Russian KHL on March 14, 2013.

After two seasons in the KHL, Holøs made a third return to the SHL, in signing an optional two-year contract with former club, Färjestads BK on June 16, 2015.

At the completion of his contract with Färjestads, Holøs was not extended by the club and as a free agent, he opted to move to Switzerland in agreeing to a two-year deal with HC Fribourg-Gottéron  of the NLA on May 29, 2017.

On 18 June 2019, Holøs having left Switzerland as a free agent opted for a fourth tenure in the SHL, agreeing to a two-year contract with Linköping HC. After completion of his two-year stint with Linköping HC, Holøs moved to Germany, in signing a one-year deal with Kölner Haie of the DEL on 14 June 2021.

International play
Holøs was first selected to play international hockey for Norway at the junior level in the 2004 World Under-18 IIHF Championships in Belarus. Developing as an allround defenceman Jonas became a fixture on the Norwegian defense, making his full men's international debut at the 2006 World Championships in Latvia, playing in all 6 games.

After playing in 4 consecutive World Championships Holøs was chosen and made his Olympic debut at the 2010 Vancouver Olympics, despite placing last in their group and eliminated by Slovakia in the Qualifying playoffs, Jonas led the entire Tournament for average ice-time per game. At the following 2010 World Championships in Germany, he scored his first full international goal when he opened the scoring in a 12-1 drubbing to Canada on May 14, 2010. Upon completion of the Championships he was again the tournament leader in average ice-time and was named among the Norwegian best in a ninth-place finish.

Following the completion of his first North American season, Holøs joined the national team in Slovakia for the 2011 World Championships. During the round robin, he was named as the best player in a 3-2 victory over Switzerland on May 5, 2011. Holøs led the Norwegian defense with 5 points, second among all tournament defensemen, in helping Norway to a 6th-place finish.

Career statistics

Regular season and playoffs

International

References

External links

Norwegian NHL records

1987 births
Living people
Colorado Avalanche draft picks
Colorado Avalanche players
Färjestad BK players
HC Fribourg-Gottéron players
Ice hockey players at the 2010 Winter Olympics
Lake Erie Monsters players
Linköping HC players
Lokomotiv Yaroslavl players
Norwegian ice hockey defencemen
Olympic ice hockey players of Norway
Ice hockey players at the 2014 Winter Olympics
People from Sarpsborg
Sparta Warriors players
Växjö Lakers players
Ice hockey players at the 2018 Winter Olympics
Sportspeople from Viken (county)